DXGS (765 AM) Radyo Pilipino is a radio station owned and operated by Radyo Pilipino Media Group through its licensee Radio Audience Developers Integrated Organization (RADIO), Inc. The station's studio is located in Brgy. Lagao, General Santos.

Established in 1965, DXGS is the pioneer station in the city. It was formerly owned by Filipinas Broadcasting Network until 1983, when it was among the stations sold to RadioCorp.

References

Radio stations in General Santos
News and talk radio stations in the Philippines
Radio stations established in 1965